C&O is an abbreviation that may refer to:
 Chesapeake and Ohio Railway in the United States ( hence the type of desk C&O desk )
 Chesapeake and Ohio Canal in the United States
 Callander and Oban Railway in Scotland